Noy Elbert "Bert" Brackett III (born October 17, 1944) is an American politician who served as a member of the Idaho Senate for the 23rd district from 2008 to 2020.

Early life and education
Bert Brackett was born in Twin Falls, Idaho, in 1944. Brackett received a Bachelor of Science in agriculture at the University of Idaho in 1966.

Career 
Brackett served one term in the Idaho House of Representatives. In 2008, Brackett was elected to represent Idaho's 23rd Legislative district, which includes Twin Falls.

Brackett is a rancher at Flat Creek Ranch. He has also served for the Idaho National Guard.

Idaho House of Representatives
In October 2005, when long-time incumbent Representative Douglas Jones resigned to take a job out of state, the Legislative District 23 Republican Central Committee met to fill the vacancy in the House seat. The committee sent three names in order of preference to Governor Dirk Kempthorne to fill the vacancy: Brackett, Benny Blick of Castleford, and Jim Patrick of Filer. Governor Otter appointed Brackett to serve the remainder of Gannon's term.

Committees
Brackett served on the Agricultural Affairs Committee and Education Committee in 2006, the Appropriations Committee and Joint Finance-Appropriations Committee from 2007 to 2008, Energy, Environment, and Technology in 2008, and the Resources and Conservation Committee from 2006 to 2008.

Idaho Senate
In July 2008, after the death of Senator Tom Gannon, the Legislative District 23 Republican Central Committee met to fill the vacancy in the Senate seat and replace Gannon's name on the upcoming general election ballot. The committee selected Representative Brackett to replace Gannon's name on the ballot and sent three names in order of preference to Governor Butch Otter to fill the vacancy: Brackett, Hartgen, and Jeanne Gannon of Buhl, the widow of Senator Gannon. Governor Otter appointed Brackett to serve the remainder of Gannon's term.

After redistricting, incumbent Senators  Brackett and Tim Corder, of Mountain Home, were drawn into the same district and faced off in the Republican primary in 2012. Brackett was endorsed by Governor Otter and won the nomination.

Committees
Transportation Committee (chairman)
Resources and Environment Committee (vice chairman)
Brackett previously served on the Finance Committee and Joint Finance-Appropriations Committee from 2009 to 2012 and on the Agriculture Affairs 2013 to 2016.

Personal life 
Brackett and his wife, Paula, have five children.

Elections

References

1944 births
Living people
Republican Party Idaho state senators
21st-century American politicians